AXN is an Asian pay television channel owned by KC Global Media Asia based in Singapore. It primarily airs action, police procedural, and reality shows. The network was formerly wholly owned by Sony Pictures Entertainment, but the Asia Pacific, Middle East and Africa channels were sold to KC Global Media in January 2020.

Programming
AXN primarily airs American and British shows (including selected shows from Sony Pictures Television, as well as third-party content from CBS Studios International, NBCUniversal Television and Fremantle), with new episodes airing on the same day after their U.S. telecast. The channel also airs original programming specifically made for Southeast Asian viewers, as well as Hollywood box office movies from Sony Pictures Entertainment (Columbia and TriStar) was officially formal and full launched on 13 June 2021 after successfully completes its first movie transmission from Singapore with Killshot and successfully completes its first movie transmission from its regional headquarters at Changi Business Park, Singapore with Jurassic Park and The Lost World: Jurassic Park on 20 and 27 June 2021.

Anime programming
Upon its launch, in the late 1990s and early 21st century, AXN used to broadcast several anime series, many of them in Japanese audio with English subtitles and held annual anime festivals around Southeast Asia. Its anime programming would later be moved to Animax Asia in 2004, the preparations for which Sony had been planning since the late 1990s. In the last quarter of 2010, selected English-dubbed anime programs from Animax Asia were broadcast during mornings and late-afternoon. This feed was then made available in the Philippines only, but was discontinued in August 2016 as AXN would focus on its main programming.

Original productions
 The Amazing Race Asia - a local version of the American reality competition series The Amazing Race; the fifth season premiered in 2016.
 The Apartment
 The Apprentice Asia -  premiered in 2013, revived as The Apprentice: ONE Championship Edition in 2021.
 Asia's Got Talent -  premiered in 2015; second season premiered in 2017; third season to air in late 2018.
 Cash Cab Asia
 The Contender Asia - Muay Thai boxing reality show similar to The Contender; season 1 premiered on January 16, 2008
 The Duke - men's lifestyle magazine talk show; season 1 premiered in 2009
 e-Buzz - entertainment news show, hosted by Jaymee Ong; ongoing
 The Kitchen Musical (was available in Singapore)
 Sony Style - lifestyle and entertainment magazine show sponsored by Sony; seasons two and three hosted by Oli Pettigrew
 Ultimate Escape - holiday adventure show; the first season aired from October 29, 2007, to November 19, 2007

Feeds

 AXN Southeast Asia (Panregional feed reaching most countries in the region)
 AXN India
 AXN Japan
 AXN Korea (joint venture with CU Media. Airs Local shows along with international shows)
 AXN Philippines (separated from the SEA feed including local advertisements, and movies)
 AXN Taiwan (Different from Asian Feed)
 AXN Beyond (later known as BeTV; now Sony Channel)
 AXN Beyond Malaysia
 AXN Beyond Pan-regional
 AXN Beyond Philippines

There are two feeds for the channel. One is aimed at viewers in Hong Kong and Thailand only, while the other one is aimed towards the rest of the region. Programming on both feeds are the same, with the exception of local advertisement and promo timings. This is also the case with the Philippine feed, which sometimes modifies its own programming due to broadcast issues.

AXN HD
AXN first launched its high-definition feed in Korea on 1 March 2009 and was later made available in Singapore on StarHub TV on 25 May 2010. In Malaysia, it was launched on 16 June 2010 on Astro and NJOI. In Thailand it was launched on 12 July 2011 on TrueVisions and in India it was made availave on Videocon D2H on 19 July 2014. It premiered in Sri Lanka on Dialog TV 2013. In the Philippines it was launched on 20 April 2015 on SkyCable, Sky Direct, Cignal and Singtel TV in Singapore.

See also
 Animax 
 AXN
 AXN Beyond (former TV channel)
 BeTV (former TV channel)
 Sony Channel (Asia) (former TV channel known as SET South East Asia)
 ONE
 GEM

References

External links
 
 Official India website 
 Official Taiwan website 
 Official Japan website 
 AXN Asia Schedule
 AXN Asia on YouTube

AXN
Sony Pictures Television
Sony Pictures Entertainment
Television channels and stations established in 1997